De Wet Roos (born 10 June 1990) is a South African-born Australian Rugby Union player for the Houston SaberCats in Major League Rugby (MLR). He currently is a referee for USA Rugby high performance referees and referees MLR matches.

His position of choice is scrum-half.

References 

1990 births
Living people
Australian expatriate rugby union players
Australian expatriate sportspeople in the United States
ACT Brumbies players
Expatriate rugby union players in the United States
Greater Sydney Rams players
Houston SaberCats players
New South Wales Country Eagles players
Rugby union scrum-halves
South African emigrants to Australia
Australian rugby union players
RC Narbonne players
Sydney (NRC team) players